Ital Dub is a studio album by Augustus Pablo originally released in 1974 and sees Tommy Cowan and Warwick Lyn replacing Clive Chin on production duties. The album also features King Tubby as Engineer, a role he would later reprise a number of times during Pablo's career.

Track listing 
 "The Big Rip Off" (Swaby) – 3:15
 "Road Block" (Barret, Beart, Bob Marley) – 3:55
 "Curly Dub" (Junior Byles, Anthony) – 3:56
 "Well Red" (Swaby) – 2:34
 "Gun Trade" (Swaby) – 3:36
 "Shake Up " (Swaby) – 3:26
 "Hillside Airstrip" (Swaby) – 3:14
 "Barbwire Disaster" (Swaby) - 2:33
 "Mr Big" (Swaby) – 3:50
 "Eli's Move" (Swaby) – 2:31
 "House Raid" (Swaby) – 3:30
 "Shake Down" (Swaby) – 3:02

External links 

Roots Archives

Augustus Pablo albums
1974 albums
Dub albums